Bhati was a large region of medieval Bengal, referred to by Abu'l-Fazl ibn Mubarak and by others until at least the 17th-century CE, during the period of the Mughal Empire. It encompassed the river delta area now lying on the borders of Bangladesh and Tripura and often referred to as eastern Bengal. The area of Bhati included the low-lying areas of the greater districts of Dhaka, Mymensingh, Tippera and Sylhet in the days of Akbar and Jahangir. 

Bhati was one of the forested areas that the Mughals began to turn into arable land. The historian Richard Eaton says that: 

Among its rulers was Musa Khan, who opposed the Mughals but was defeated by them and imprisoned for some time in Dhaka (prev. Dacca), being freed in 1613 and thereafter co-operating with his former enemies in various military expeditions.

References

Citations

Sources

Further reading 

Medieval Bengal
Bengal Subah